Sayn-Wittgenstein-Hachenburg (sometimes called Sayn-Hachenburg) was a German County located in Rhineland-Palatinate, near the river Sieg.

When Count William III of Sayn-Wittgenstein-Sayn died in 1623 without clear heirs, the Archbishop of Cologne occupied the vacant County until the succession was settled. It was settled by treaty in 1648, when the county was given jointly to Countesses Ernestine and Johanetta, two sisters who were granddaughters of Count William, and their mother Dowager Countess Louise Juliane made regent. But shortly after the treaty, the county was split between the two. Ernestine's portion was called "Sayn-Wittgenstein-Hachenburg". Johanetta's was "Sayn-Wittgenstein-Sayn-Altenkirchen" (or Sayn-Altenkirchen for short). Their mother remained regent for both counties until 1652, when Johanetta and Ernestine separately ruled their respective Counties. Sayn-Wittgenstein-Hachenburg was inherited by Countess Magdalena Christina in 1661 following Ernestine's death. It passed to the Burgraves of Kirchberg in 1715, to the Princes of Nassau-Weilburg in 1799,  The title passed through the female line and is held by the Grand Duke of Luxembourg.

Countesses of Sayn-Hachenburg (1648–1827)
 Ernestine Salentine (1648–1661)
 Louise Juliane (1648–1652) – Regent
 Maximilian Joseph (1661–1675), also Count of Manderscheid-Blankenheim. 
 Magdalena Christina (1675–1715), also Burgravine consort of Kirchberg.
 George Frederick (1715–1749), also Burgrave of Kirchberg.
 William Louis (1749–1751), also Burgrave of Kirchberg.
 William George (1751–1776), also Burgrave of Kirchberg.
 Louise Isabelle (1776–1827), Princess consort of Nassau-Weilburg.

References 
 Matthias Dahlhoff: Geschichte der Grafschaft Sayn., Dillenburg 1874.
 Findbuch für die Überlieferung im Hauptstaatsarchiv Wiesbaden: Hellmuth Gensicke (Bearb.): Grafschaft Sayn-Hachenburg, Akten, (Repertorien des Hessischen Hauptstaatsarchivs Wiesbaden 340), hrsg. vom Hessischen Hauptstaatsarchiv Wiesbaden und von der Historischen Kommission für Nassau, Wiesbaden 1979.
 Markus Müller: Gemeinden und Staat in der Reichsgrafschaft Sayn-Hachenburg 1652–1799, (Beiträge zur Geschichte Nassaus und des Landes Hessen, Bd. 3), zugl. Siegen Univ. Diss. 2004. Historische Kommission für Nassau : Wiesbaden 2005.  (Forschungsarbeit mit besonderer Berücksichtigung der inneren Entwicklung).
 Daniel Schneider: Die Entwicklung der Konfessionen in der Grafschaft Sayn im Grundriss, in: Heimat-Jahrbuch des Kreises Altenkirchen, 58. Jahrgang, 2015, p. 7480.
 Daniel Schneider: Die Landstände in der Grafschaft Sayn sowie in Sayn-Altenkirchen und Sayn-Hachenburg, in: Jahrbuch für westdeutsche Landesgeschichte, 33. Jahrgang, 2007, p. 213-229.

Counties of the Holy Roman Empire
States and territories established in 1648
1648 establishments in the Holy Roman Empire
Former states and territories of Rhineland-Palatinate
History of the Westerwald